Purificacion Santamarta is a paralympic athlete from Spain competing mainly in category T11 sprint events.

Biography
Purificacion has competed in seven Paralympics winning a total of 16 medals eleven of them gold.  Her first games were way back in 1980 where she competed in the 60m and 400m winning the class A silver medal in the 400m.  In 1984 she competed in the long jump and won the gold medal in both the 100m and 400m.  Her third games were in Seoul in 1988 where she won defended her 100m title and won silver medals in the 400m and long jump.  The  1992 Summer Paralympics were in front of her home crowd and she didn't disappoint them winning her third consecutive 100m title and adding 200m, 400m and 800m golds.  In 1996 she succeeded in defending her 100m, 200m and 400m titles, but didn't attempt the 800m.  2000 saw her lose in the 100m for the first time in five games when Adria Santos of Brazil beat her in to second place but she did make it three consecutive 400m golds.  In 2004 Summer Paralympics she managed a bronze in the 200m but missed out in the 100m and 400m.

References

Paralympic athletes of Spain
Athletes (track and field) at the 1980 Summer Paralympics
Athletes (track and field) at the 1984 Summer Paralympics
Athletes (track and field) at the 1988 Summer Paralympics
Athletes (track and field) at the 1992 Summer Paralympics
Athletes (track and field) at the 1996 Summer Paralympics
Athletes (track and field) at the 2000 Summer Paralympics
Athletes (track and field) at the 2004 Summer Paralympics
Paralympic gold medalists for Spain
Paralympic silver medalists for Spain
Paralympic bronze medalists for Spain
Living people
Medalists at the 1980 Summer Paralympics
Medalists at the 1984 Summer Paralympics
Medalists at the 1988 Summer Paralympics
Medalists at the 1992 Summer Paralympics
Medalists at the 1996 Summer Paralympics
Medalists at the 2000 Summer Paralympics
Medalists at the 2004 Summer Paralympics
Year of birth missing (living people)
Paralympic medalists in athletics (track and field)
Spanish female sprinters
Spanish female long jumpers